Phtheochroa issikii is a species of moth of the family Tortricidae. It is found in Japan.

References

Moths described in 1977
Phtheochroa